Jameon Kalchevis Lewis (born November 26, 1991) is an American football wide receiver who is currently a free agent. He played college football at Mississippi State.

Early years
Lewis attended Tylertown High School in Tylertown, Mississippi, where he helped lead his team to the Mississippi 3A State Championship. As the starting quarterback, Lewis only lost 4 games from his sophomore to senior year. Lewis led the chiefs to back to back State Championships appearance, winning his final year.

Lewis was rated as a three-star recruit by 247sports.com and Rivals.com.He was also rated no. 24 top prospects in MS regardless of position. Listed on the Jackson (Miss.) Clarion Ledger's 40 most wanted recruits. One of the two quarterbacks chosen for the Mississippi-Alabama all star game roster.

College career

Freshman and sophomore seasons
After redshirting in 2010 season, Lewis caught 4 passes for 113 yards in his first college game, a 59–14 over Memphis. He caught only three more passes in the 2011 season. Lewis would play in all 13 games in 2012, recording 10 catches.

Junior season (2013)
Lewis had a breakout year in 2013. In a 62–7 win over Troy, he recorded a passing, rushing, and receiving touchdown. He had his first 100-yard receiving game in 59-26 loss to LSU, and also recorded touchdown passes in games against Kentucky (a game in which he repeated the feat of throwing, catching, and running in a touchdown) and Texas A&M.

In the 2013 Liberty Bowl against Rice, Lewis set a school single-game record with 220 receiving yards, bringing his season total to 923, the fourth-most single-season yards by a receiver in school history.

Senior season (2014)
Lewis threw his fourth career pass (also his fourth career touchdown pass) against South Alabama. He missed several games during the season with a leg injury but caught enough passes to rank 8th on the Bulldogs' career leaderboards in receptions and 10th in yards at the time.

Statistics

Professional career
Lewis was signed to the Toronto Argonauts practice squad in October 2016. He was re-signed by the team in December. The Argos had made a lot of changes in their front office the following year, and Lewis was waived after mini camp.

On March 22, 2018, Lewis was assigned to the Albany Empire. On April 7, 2018, he was placed on reassignment.

References

1991 births
American football wide receivers
Canadian football wide receivers
African-American players of American football
African-American players of Canadian football
Mississippi State Bulldogs football players
People from Tylertown, Mississippi
Players of American football from Mississippi
Toronto Argonauts players
Albany Empire (AFL) players
Arizona Rattlers players
Living people
21st-century African-American sportspeople